This is a list of airports in Cuba, grouped by type and sorted by location.

Cuba, officially the Republic of Cuba, is an island country in the Caribbean. It is an archipelago of islands located in the northern Caribbean Sea at the confluence with the Gulf of Mexico and the Atlantic Ocean. The United States lies to the northwest, the Bahamas to the north, Haiti to the east, Jamaica and the Cayman Islands to the south, and Mexico to the west. The country is subdivided into 15 provinces and one special municipality (Isla de la Juventud, the country's second largest island). Cuba's capital and largest city is Havana.



Airports 

Airport names shown in bold have scheduled passenger service on commercial airlines.

See also 

 Transportation in Cuba
 Military of Cuba
 List of airports in the Caribbean
 List of airports by ICAO code: M#MU - Cuba
 Wikipedia: WikiProject Aviation/Airline destination lists: North America#Cuba

References 
  El Instituto de Aeronáutica Civil de Cuba (IACC)
 
 
  - includes IATA codes
 Great Circle Mapper: Airports in Cuba, reference for airport codes

 
Cuba
Airports
Airports
Cuba